McLaren Transport Ltd v Somerville [1996] 3 NZLR 424 is a cited case in New Zealand regarding the awarding of exemplary damages.

Background
Somerville took a hay conditioner to McLaren transport to get a tyre changed. McLaren's employee Stumbles undertook to change the tyre, although he had little training in changing tyres. As Stumbles was unable to find a 15-inch tyre in  stock, he then proceeded to try an fit a 15 1/2 inch tyre instead. After 3 attempts at inflating the incorrect sized tyre, it finally exploded, injuring Somerville whom was assisting Stumbles with the tyre.

As Somerville was legally  barred from suing McLaren for damages for his injury due to Accident Compensation law, he sued instead for exemplary damages, with the District Court awarding $15,000.

McLaren appealed.

Held
The Court ruled that the award for damages was justified.

References

Court of Appeal of New Zealand cases
New Zealand tort case law
1996 in New Zealand law
1996 in case law